Žika Gojković is a Serbian politician. At one time a leading figure in the Serbian Renewal Movement (Srpski pokret obnove, SPO), he became the leader of the breakaway Movement for the Restoration of the Kingdom of Serbia (Pokret obnove Kraljevine Srbije, POKS) on its formation in 2017.

In late 2021, the POKS became divided into rival groups led by Gojković and former Belgrade mayor Vojislav Mihailović. For several months, both Gojković and Mihailović claimed to be the legitimate leader of the party. Gojković legally headed the party until 1 August 2022, when the Serbian ministry of public administration and local self-government ruled in favour of Mihailović.

Gojković is currently serving his fifth term as a member of the National Assembly of Serbia.

Early life and private career
Gojković was born in Sombor, in what was then the Socialist Autonomous Province of Vojvodina in the Socialist Republic of Serbia, Socialist Federal Republic of Yugoslavia. He has a Bachelor of Management Studies degree in economy and was elected president of Sombor's sports association in 2014.

Politician

Serbian Renewal Movement
Gojković was the chair of the SPO's provincial board in Vojvodina for several years and was a party vice-president at the republic level.

Early candidacies
Gojković was included on the SPO's electoral lists for the 2000, 2003, and 2007 Serbian parliamentary elections, although he did not receive a mandate on any of these occasions. In 2000 and 2007, the SPO failed to cross the electoral threshold. The party contested the 2003 election in an alliance with New Serbia (Nova Srbija, NS)  and won twenty-two seats; Gojković appeared the forty-ninth position and was not afterward chosen for a mandate. (From 2000 to 2011, assembly mandates were awarded to sponsoring parties or coalitions rather than to individual candidates, and it was common practice for the mandates to be assigned out of numerical order. Gojković could have been awarded a mandate despite his relatively low position on the list, but he was not.)

The SPO contested the 2004 Vojvodina provincial election as part of the Clean Hands of Vojvodina (Čiste ruke Vojvodine) coalition. Gojković appeared in the eleventh position on its electoral list, which did not cross the threshold for representation in the provincial assembly.

Parliamentarian
For the 2008 Serbian parliamentary election, the SPO joined the For a European Serbia (Za evropsku Srbiju, ZES) coalition led by Boris Tadić's Democratic Party (Demokratska stranka, DS). Gojković received the thirty-ninth position on the ZES list, which won 102 seats. On this occasion, he was included in the SPO's assembly delegation. The election did not produce a clear winner, but For a European Serbia ultimately formed a coalition government with the Socialist Party of Serbia (Socijalistička partija Srbije, SPS), and Gojković served as a supporter of the administration. In his first parliamentary term, he was a member of the committee on constitutional affairs, the committee on youth and sports, and the committee on agriculture; a deputy member of the committee on defense and security and the committee on trade and tourism; and a member of the parliamentary friendship groups with Australia, Italy, and the Sovereign Order of Malta.

Serbia's electoral system was reformed in 2011, such that parliamentary mandates were awarded to candidates on successful lists in numerical order. The SPO contested the 2012 parliamentary election in an alliance with the Liberal Democratic Party (Liberalno demokratska partija, LDP) called U-Turn (Preokret). Gojković received the thirteenth position on the coalition's list and was re-elected when the list won nineteen mandates. The Serbian Progressive Party (Srpska napredna stranka, SNS) won the election and afterward formed a new coalition government with the SPS and other parties; the SPO served in opposition. Gojković was a member of the committee on the diaspora and Serbs in the region and the committee on finance, budget, and control of public spending; a deputy member of Serbia's delegation to the Parliamentary Assembly of the Organization for Security and Co-operation in Europe (OSCE PA); and a member of the parliamentary friendship groups with Austria and the United States of America.

The SPO joined the SNS's political alliance in the buildup to the 2014 election. Gojković received the forty-first position on the SNS-led Aleksandar Vučić — Future We Believe In list and was easily re-elected when the list won a landslide victory with 158 out of 250 mandates. He again served as a government supporter. In his third term, he was a member of the finance committee and the defense and internal affairs committee, a deputy member of the diaspora committee, the leader of Serbia's friendship group with Brazil, and a member of the friendship groups with France, Italy, the Netherlands, and the United States.

He received the eighty-second position on the Progressive Party's Aleksandar Vučić – Serbia Is Winning list in 2016 and was re-elected when the alliance won a second consecutive majority with 131 seats. The SPO did not win enough seats to form its own assembly group, and the party's elected members served in caucus with the Progressive Party.

Local politics
The SPO contested the 2004 Serbian local elections in Sombor in an alliance with the People's Democratic Party (Narodna demokratska stranka, NDS). The alliance won five seats; Gojković appeared on its list and was included afterward in the SPO's delegation to the municipal assembly. He was re-elected in the 2008, 2012, and 2016 local elections, although on each occasion he resigned his seat shortly thereafter.

Movement for the Restoration of the Kingdom of Serbia
Several SPO members, including Gojković, were expelled from the party in May 2017 after recommending that longtime leader Vuk Drašković step down from his position to become an honorary president. In June of the same year, many of these former SPO members established the POKS. The new organization was registered as a party on 17 July 2017, and Gojković was chosen as its leader on 15 October. He continued to caucus with the Progressive Party, and, on being chosen as party leader, noted the POKS's good relations with the SNS and with Serbian president Aleksandar Vučić.

During the 2016–20 parliament, Gojković was a member (and later a deputy member) of the finance committee, a deputy member of the foreign affairs committee, once again the head of Serbia's parliamentary friendship group with Brazil, and a member of its parliamentary friendship groups with France, Georgia, Italy, the Netherlands, and the United States of America.

In February 2020, Gojković called for the direct election of mayors and two-thirds of assembly members in Serbia's local elections.

The POKS contested in the 2020 Serbian parliamentary election on a coalition list called For the Kingdom of Serbia. Gojković was the list bearer, although he agreed to have Ljubinko Đurković appear ahead of him in the first position. The list narrowly missed crossing the electoral threshold to win representation in the assembly.

POKS split
On 23 December 2021, it was reported that the POKS presidency had met to remove Gojković as party leader on the grounds that his four-year term had expired in October. POKS official Miloš Parandilović responded that the meeting had been illegitimately convened by a group of party officials seeking to carry out a coup and that Gojković was still the legitimate president.

The anti-Gojković group announced on 28 December that he and his prominent ally Mirko Čikiriz had been expelled from the party. Gojković's supporters rejected this, indicating that Serbia's ministry of public administration and local self-government had issued a statement the previous day identifying him as the party's only legitimate representative. Gojković's group held an assembly in Topola on 2 January 2021, at which time he was re-confirmed as party leader. The rival group held an assembly in Belgrade the following day and elected Vojislav Mihailović as leader.

In the aftermath of the split, Mihailović accused Gojković of concealing his appointment by the Serbian government as a director of Mtel, a telecommunications company in Montenegro primarily owned by the state company Telekom Srbija. Mihailovic's supporters further asserted that the appointment was evidence of collusion between Gojković and Vučić's government. Gojković rejected this, saying that he received only minimal compensation for serving as a director (which he had reported in any event) and that it was not evidence of ongoing ties to the SNS.

Gojković announced in February 2022 that his POKS group would contest the upcoming presidential, parliamentary, and Belgrade elections in an alliance with Dveri. He appeared in the second position on the Dveri–POKS alliance's Patriotic Bloc for the Restoration of the Kingdom of Serbia list and was elected to a fifth term when the list won ten mandates. Gojković's POKS group won four seats in total. Shortly after the election, he lost the rights to the POKS name when Mihailović was recognized as its legitimate leader.

In August 2022, Gojković and two of the three other delegates elected with his POKS group supported SNS candidate Vladimir Orlić to become the new president of the national assembly. The fourth delegate, Miloš Parandilović, who had hitherto been one of Gojković's key allies, opposed Orlić's candidacy. Parandilović later charged that Gojković wanted to join Serbia's SNS-led government; he also accused Gojković of giving up his claim to the POKS leadership, thereby allowing Mihailović to take over the party.

Gojković is now a member of the assembly's defence and internal affairs committee and a member of Serbia's delegation to the Parliamentary Assembly of the Francophonie (where Serbia has associate member status). He is not a member of any parliamentary group.

References

1972 births
Living people
Politicians from Sombor
Members of the National Assembly (Serbia)
Deputy Members of the Parliamentary Assembly of the Organization for Security and Co-operation in Europe
Members of the Parliamentary Assembly of the Francophonie
Serbian Renewal Movement politicians
Movement for the Restoration of the Kingdom of Serbia politicians